Johannes Piet "Joop" van der Reijden (7 January 1927 – 3 February 2006) was a Dutch politician of the Christian Democratic Appeal (CDA) and businessman.

Decorations

References

External links

Official
  Drs. J.P. (Joop) van der Reijden Parlement & Politiek

 

 

 
 

1927 births
2006 deaths
Christian Democratic Appeal politicians
Christian Historical Union politicians
Directors of football clubs in the Netherlands
Dutch corporate directors
Dutch hospital administrators
Dutch members of the Dutch Reformed Church
Dutch nonprofit executives
Dutch nonprofit directors
Dutch public broadcasting administrators
Dutch sports executives and administrators
Erasmus University Rotterdam alumni
Knights of the Order of the Netherlands Lion
Mayors in South Holland
Municipal councillors in South Holland
Officers of the Order of Orange-Nassau
People from Leiden
People from Oegstgeest
Protestant Church Christians from the Netherlands
State Secretaries for Health of the Netherlands
20th-century Dutch businesspeople
20th-century Dutch economists
20th-century Dutch politicians
21st-century Dutch politicians